Two ships of the Japanese Navy have been named Wakamiya:

  was a seaplane tender converted from a transport ship in 1914. She was stricken in 1931
  was an   both launched and sunk in 1943
 Wakamiya-maru, was a Japanese cargo ship whose crew members became the first Japanese to circumnavigate the globe after their ship went off course after getting caught in a storm en route from Ishinomaki in the Tōhoku region of northern Japan to Edo (now Tokyo) in November 1793.

Japanese Navy ship names
Imperial Japanese Navy ship names